Francisco Contreras Báez (born 16 May 1999) is a Mexican professional footballer who plays as a midfielder for Liga MX club Tijuana.

Career statistics

Club

References

External links
 
 
 

Living people
1999 births
Ascenso MX players
Association football midfielders
Dorados de Sinaloa footballers
FC Juárez footballers
Liga MX players
Footballers from Sinaloa
Sportspeople from Culiacán
Mexican footballers